Dr. Jürgen Schade (born in Berlin, Germany, 3 December 1942) was president of the Deutsches Patent- und Markenamt (DPMA) for 7 years, from 2001 to 31 December 2008. He studied theology and obtained a PhD in law, before starting to work in 1977 at the Deutsches Patent- und Markenamt.

References

1942 births
German civil servants
Jurists from Berlin
Living people